St. Johnsburg is a hamlet in the town of Wheatfield in Niagara County, New York, United States.

References

Hamlets in New York (state)
Hamlets in Niagara County, New York